Marco Antonio Barrero Jordán (born January 26, 1962 in Santa Cruz de la Sierra) is a Bolivian retired football goalkeeper.

Career
He played for several clubs, including Wilstermann, Bolívar, The Strongest and Guabirá. Between 1987 and 1999, Barrero obtained a total number of 32 caps for the Bolivia national team.

References

External links

1962 births
Living people
Sportspeople from Santa Cruz de la Sierra
Bolivian footballers
Bolivia international footballers
Association football goalkeepers
1987 Copa América players
1989 Copa América players
1991 Copa América players
C.D. Jorge Wilstermann players
Club Bolívar players
Guabirá players
Oriente Petrolero players
The Strongest players